Maria Catalano (born 27 February 1982) is an English snooker player.

Career
In the 2007 season she won the British Open and the Connie Gough National Championship. In December 2002, she was ranked number four in the world. She was ranked world number one for the 2013–14 season. In 2016 she described her ambition to win the Women's World Snooker Championship, to date she has been runner-up five times, the most recently in 2018.

Catalano is a cousin of men's snooker champion Ronnie O'Sullivan. In May 2022 she became the first woman to play in the World Seniors Championship, at the Crucible.

Performance timeline
World Women's Snooker

Titles and achievements

References

External links
 Profile on Global Snooker

1982 births
Living people
Sportspeople from Dudley
English snooker players
English people of Sicilian descent
Female snooker players